The 1982 Bulgarian Cup Final was the 42nd final of the Bulgarian Cup (in this period the tournament was named Cup of the Soviet Army), and was contested between Lokomotiv Sofia and Lokomotiv Plovdiv on 12 June 1982 at Slavi Aleksiev Stadium in Pleven. Lokomotiv Sofia won the final 2–1 after extra time.

Match

Details

See also
1981–82 A Group

References

Bulgarian Cup finals
PFC Lokomotiv Plovdiv matches
Cup Final